Singapore Radio Awards 2010, was the 5th radio awards ceremony presented by Singapore's MediaCorp. to honour the best radio personalities and radio shows in 2009. After a hiatus in 2008 and 2009, the 2010 show took place on March 13, at MediaCorp TV Theatre. The ceremony also featured a live webcast for the first time.

The hosts for the night were Justin Ang and Vernon A, also known as The Muttons from 987FM. It was their first time hosting the Singapore Radio Awards, as past ceremonies engaged other TV and stage hosts, instead of utilizing talents from within its radio fold.

Awards

24 awards were presented during the show. 987FM was the biggest winner of the night, winning a total of 4 awards, while Vimala from Tamil station Oli 96.8FM won 3 individual awards. In the other categories, Glenn Ong and Cruz Teng won "Radio Personality of the Year" and "Most Popular Radio Personality" for the 4th consecutive time.

Lifetime Achievement Award
Ibrahim Jamil |  Warna 94.2FM
 
Best Radio Show
987FM  |  Muttons to Midnight   |  Vernon A & Justin Ang
 
Radio Personality of the Year – Media’s Choice
ENGLISH  |  Glenn Ong  | Class 95FM
CHINESE  | Dennis Chew  | Y.E.S. 93.3FM
MALAY |  AB Shaik  | Warna 94.2FM
TAMIL  | Vimala  | Oli 96.8FM
 
Most Popular Radio Personality
938LIVE |  Stanley Leong
987FM |  Daniel Ong
Class 95FM |  Jean Danker
Gold 90.5FM  | Brian Richmond
Lush 99.5FM  | Hossan Leong
Symphony 92.4FM  | Loh Sin Yee
Capital 95.8FM  | Ong Teck Chon
Love 97.2FM  | Jeff Goh
Y.E.S. 93.3FM |  Cruz Teng
Ria 89.7FM  | Hafeez Glamour
Warna 94.2FM  | TG
Oli 96.8FM |  Vimala	

Most Creative Radio Trailer
ENGLISH |  “UK Top 20”  by  Shan Wee, 987FM
CHINESE  | “Father’s Day Good Wishes”  by Chua Lee Lian,  Love 97.2FM
MALAY  | “Libur ke Batam” (Holiday in Batam) by KC & Nity Baizura, Ria 89.7FM
TAMIL  | “Singapore Parenting Congress” by Vimala, Oli 96.8FM	

Best Radio Personality Blog
Rosalyn Lee  | 987FM
 
Best Dressed Radio Personality
Claressa Monteiro  | Gold 90.5FM

Award Presenters
Award presenters included:
Lui Teck Yew, Acting Minister for Information, Communications and The Arts.
Lucas Chow, Chief Executive Officer, MediaCorp
Shaun Seow, Deputy Chief Executive Officer, MediaCorp
Florence Lian, Managing Director (Radio), MediaCorp
Irene Ang, Entertainer

Guest Performers
Jason Castro

References

Radio in Singapore
2010 music awards